Herbert Wesley Carey (30 May 1905 – 10 July 1994) was an Australian rules footballer who played for the Fitzroy Football Club and Hawthorn Football Club in the Victorian Football League (VFL).

Notes

External links 
		

 Bert Carey: KB on Reflection

1905 births
1994 deaths
Australian rules footballers from Victoria (Australia)
Fitzroy Football Club players
Hawthorn Football Club players
Euroa Football Club players